The 2013–14 Rwanda National Football League (known as the Turbo King National Football League for sponsorship reasons) was the 37th season of the Rwanda National Football League since it began play in 1975. The season began on 28 September 2013 and concluded on 4 May 2014. Rayon Sports were the defending champions, having won their 7th title the previous season against the Greely team.

Armée Patriotique Rwandaise (A.P.R.) won a record 14th title, having finished at the top of the table with 64 points, and represented Rwanda in the 2015 CAF Champions League.

Participating teams

League table

Results

References

Rwanda
Rwanda National Football League seasons
football
football